Teichwolframsdorf is a village and a former municipality in the district of Greiz, in Thuringia, Germany. Since 1 January 2012, it is part of the municipality Mohlsdorf-Teichwolframsdorf.

History
Within the German Empire (1871-1918), Teichwolframsdorf was part of the Grand Duchy of Saxe-Weimar-Eisenach.

References

Former municipalities in Thuringia